This list includes notable graduates and professors affiliated with the Hong Kong University of Science and Technology (HKUST).

Alumni

Politics 
 Starry Lee, Hong Kong politician, chairperson of the largest pro-establishment Beijing-loyalist party, the Democratic Alliance for the Betterment and Progress of Hong Kong (DAB). 
 Ben Chan, member of Hong Kong Legislative Council (Geographical constituency New Territories West) and was a member of Tsuen Wan District Council (Yeung Uk Road). 
 Wong Pak-yu, member of the Yuen Long District Council.
 Lam Chun, Hong Kong social activist and member of the Yuen Long District Council for Shui Wah.

Academia
 Tinglong Dai, Professor of Operations Management and Business Analytics at the Carey Business School, Johns Hopkins University
 Panos Kalnis, professor of computer science at the King Abdullah University of Science and Technology.
 Hean Tat Keh (MBA 1993), Professor of Marketing and Director of Research (Marketing) at Monash University.
 Sun Binyong, academician of the Chinese Academy of Sciences (CAS).
 Xin Zhang, professor of mechanical engineering, electrical & computer engineering, biomedical engineering, materials science & engineering, and the Photonics Center at Boston University (BU).

Business
 Douglas Woo, chairman & managing director of Wheelock & Co. and managing director of its subsidiary Wheelock Properties and several other subsidiaries.

Science and technology
 Frank Wang, billionaire entrepreneur, engineer, and the founder and CEO of the Shenzhen-based technology company DJI, the world's largest manufacturer of commercial drones. 
 Chan Yik Hei, young entrepreneur in Hong Kong.
 Kaikit Wong, Fellow of the Institute of Electrical and Electronics Engineers (IEEE).

Entertainment 
 Alfred Cheung, actor, director, writer and producer.
 Koni Lui, model and 2nd runner up at the Miss Hong Kong 2006 pageant. She represented Hong Kong at Miss International 2006 in Tokyo, Japan and Beijing, China.
 Myolie Wu, actress and singer.
 Angel Wong, TV and radio personality, host and columnist.

Sports
 Sam Whiteman, former New Zealand cricketer who played for Auckland in New Zealand domestic cricket. As of November 2012, he was a Senior Director at The Corporate Executive Board Company, having previously worked in positions with Virgin Money, ANZ, and the National Australia Bank.
 Chan Yuk Chi, former Hong Kong professional footballer. He is currently the head coach of Hong Kong First Division club Tai Po where he spent his entire playing career.

Faculty

School of Business and Management
 Utpal Bhattacharya
 Jennifer Carpenter (academic)
 KC Chan
 Robert Helsley
 Christopher A. Pissarides
 Bruno Solnik

School of Engineering
 Ishfaq Ahmad (computer scientist)
 Satya N. Atluri
 Mansun Chan
 Leroy Chang
 Jing Kevin Chen
 Pascale Fung
 Daniel Palomar
 Pan Hui
 Wei Shyy
 Johnny Kin On Sin
 Kang L. Wang
 Derick Wood
 Qiang Yang
 Chik Patrick Yue
 Zhao Tianshou

School of Science
 Shiu-Yuen Cheng
 M. L. Chye
 Charles Clarke (botanist)
 Yuefan Deng
 Shengwang Du
 He Xuhua
 Jing-Song Huang
 Nancy Ip
 Li Jianshu
 Wu Yundong
 Zhang Mingjie

School of Humanities and Social Science
 Arif Dirlik
 Jack Goldstone
 Jean C. Oi
 Barry Sautman

Hong Kong University of Science and Technology
Alumni of the Hong Kong University of Science and Technology
Academic staff of the Hong Kong University of Science and Technology